KTK may refer to:
TV Kanazawa, a Japanese broadcast network
Kochi Tuskers Kerala, an Indian cricket team
Khans of Tarkir, a video game block